Marzia Grossi (born 2 September 1970) is a former professional tennis player from Italy.

Biography
Grossi, who comes from Florence, began playing tennis at the age of eight.

She debuted on the professional circuit in 1989 and was more successful in doubles that year with a semifinal appearance at Athens the highlight.

From 1990 to 1992, she didn't feature in any WTA Tour events.

She won a WTA tournament title at San Marino in 1993, with a win over top seed Barbara Rittner in the final. The title in San Marino took her ranking into the top 100 and in September she reached a career best 79 in the world.

At the 1993 French Open, she qualified for the main draw of a Grand Slam singles match for the first time and took 13th seed Nathalie Tauziat to three sets in an opening-round loss. Her best French Open performance was a third-round appearance in 1994, and she also appeared in the singles main draws at the three other Grand Slam tournaments that year.

She appeared in two Fed Cup ties for Italy in 1994, partnering Rita Grande in the doubles, against Denmark and France.

WTA career finals

Singles: 1 (1 title)

ITF finals

Singles: 6 (2–4)

Doubles: 8 (7–1)

References

External links
 
 
 

1970 births
Living people
Italian female tennis players
Sportspeople from Florence
20th-century Italian women
21st-century Italian women